Single White Spenny was a Canadian mockumentary television series that aired briefly on Showcase in 2011. The series chronicles the misadventures of a fictionalized version of Spencer Rice, played by himself, as he dates various women after his wife divorced him for being "an immature man-child emotionally incapable of a serious relationship."

The cast also included Deb McGrath, Amy Matysio, Peter Martin, Wayne Thomas Yorke and Nikki Payne.

The series premiered on June 2, 2011. It aired eight episodes, and was not renewed for a second season.

References

External links

2011 Canadian television series debuts
Showcase (Canadian TV channel) original programming
2011 Canadian television series endings
2010s Canadian sitcoms
Canadian mockumentary television series